Poul Hermann Poulsen (07.19.1947 - 06.27.1999) was a Danish designer. He worked among others designing ceramic tiles for Gangso Furniture (Gangsø Møbler) in Faarvang, Denmark. Previously, he was the proprietor of Faaborg Pottery (1976–1978) at the city square in Faaborg, Denmark, where he designed pottery. It later evolved into the design of ceramics, tiles, carvings, pictures, oil paintings, canvas prints, drawings and photo posters, etc.

Today you can still find his works, for example on eBay and miscellaneous markets where they are traded as original 70s retro design.

Some of his designs typical characteristic is the use of Hogweed flowers and rushes, which often are printed on the tiles or images. But also circular patterns in various colors and provoked cracks are often seen in his design. In the 70s he worked most in those currently fashionable brownish shades, but towards the end of the 80s he experimented much with other more wild color paired with copper, silver and gold shades.

Almost all of his designs bear the signature "P Hermann" in the lower right corner. The signature is roughly as seen in the picture, but it can be difficult to decipher, since it is often written with icing or marked / scratched into the subject in hand. Characteristic is always the pointy "P" followed by a capital "H" and lowercase italics. Sometimes there's an underline too.

Most widespread is his work from the time 1978-1983, where he designed ceramic tiles for Gangso Furniture (Gangsø Møbler). These are still largely loaded inserted into dining tables, coffee tables, etc., which are still traded used as complete furnishings.

Poul H. Poulsen died of cardiac arrest in 1999, and is buried at Ulkebol cemetery in Sonderborg, Denmark.

References

http://www.ebay.co.uk/itm/Gangso-Mobler-Danish-Extending-Dining-Table-Tile-Inserts-and-Six-Chairs-/181058325625
http://classifieds.castanet.net/details/danish_modern_mid-century_modern_gangso_mobler_coffee_tableend_table_made_denmark/1492714/

Danish designers
1947 births
1999 deaths